

Events

Pre-1600
1579 – The Archdiocese of Manila is made a diocese by a papal bull with Domingo de Salazar being its first bishop.

1601–1900
1685 – James II of England and VII of Scotland is proclaimed King upon the death of his brother Charles II.
1694 – The warrior queen Dandara, leader of the runaway slaves in Quilombo dos Palmares, Brazil, is captured and commits suicide rather than be returned to a life of slavery.
1778 – American Revolutionary War: In Paris the Treaty of Alliance and the Treaty of Amity and Commerce are signed by the United States and France signaling official recognition of the new republic.
  1778   – New York became the third state to ratify the Articles of Confederation.
1788 – Massachusetts becomes the sixth state to ratify the United States Constitution.
1806 – Battle of San Domingo: British naval victory against the French in the Caribbean.
1819 – The Treaty of Singapore was signed by Sir Thomas Stamford Raffles, Hussein Shah of Johor, and Temenggong Abdul Rahman, and it is now recognised as the founding of modern Singapore. 
1820 – The first 86 African American immigrants sponsored by the American Colonization Society depart New York to start a settlement in present-day Liberia.
1833 – Otto becomes the first modern King of Greece.
1840 – Signing of the Treaty of Waitangi, establishing New Zealand as a British colony.
1843 – The first minstrel show in the United States, The Virginia Minstrels, opens (Bowery Amphitheatre in New York City).
1851 – The largest Australian bushfires in a populous region in recorded history take place in the state of Victoria.
1862 – American Civil War: Forces under the command of Ulysses S. Grant and Andrew H. Foote give the Union its first victory of the war, capturing Fort Henry, Tennessee in the Battle of Fort Henry.
1899 – Spanish–American War: The Treaty of Paris, a peace treaty between the United States and Spain, is ratified by the United States Senate.
1900 – The Permanent Court of Arbitration, an international arbitration court at The Hague, is created when the Senate of the Netherlands ratifies an 1899 peace conference decree.

1901–present
1918 – British women over the age of 30 who meet minimum property qualifications, get the right to vote when  Representation of the People Act 1918 is passed by Parliament.
1919 – The American Legion is founded.
  1919   – The five-day Seattle General Strike begins, as more than 65,000 workers in the city of Seattle, Washington, walk off the job.
1922 – The Washington Naval Treaty is signed in Washington, D.C., limiting the naval armaments of United States, Britain, Japan, France, and Italy.
1934 – Far-right leagues rally in front of the Palais Bourbon in an attempted coup against the French Third Republic, creating a political crisis in France.
1944 – World War II: The Great Raids Against Helsinki begins.
1951 – The Canadian Army enters combat in the Korean War.
  1951   – The Broker, a Pennsylvania Railroad passenger train derails near Woodbridge Township, New Jersey. The accident kills 85 people and injures over 500 more. The wreck is one of the worst rail disasters in American history.
1952 – Elizabeth II becomes Queen of the United Kingdom and her other Realms and Territories and Head of the Commonwealth upon the death of her father, George VI. At the exact moment of succession, she was in a tree house at the Treetops Hotel in Kenya.
1958 – Eight Manchester United F.C. players and 15 other passengers are killed in the Munich air disaster.
1959 – Jack Kilby of Texas Instruments files the first patent for an integrated circuit.
  1959   – At Cape Canaveral, Florida, the first successful test firing of a Titan intercontinental ballistic missile is accomplished.
1973 – The  7.6 Luhuo earthquake strikes Sichuan Province, causing widespread destruction and killing at least 2,199 people.
1976 – In testimony before a United States Senate subcommittee, Lockheed Corporation president Carl Kotchian admits that the company had paid out approximately $3 million in bribes to the office of Japanese Prime Minister Kakuei Tanaka.
1978 – The Blizzard of 1978, one of the worst Nor'easters in New England history, hit the region, with sustained winds of 65 mph and snowfall of four inches an hour.
1981 – The National Resistance Army of Uganda launches an attack on a Ugandan Army installation in the central Mubende District to begin the Ugandan Bush War.
1987 – Justice Mary Gaudron becomes the first woman to be appointed to the High Court of Australia.
1988 – Michael Jordan makes his signature slam dunk from the free throw line inspiring Air Jordan and the Jumpman logo.
1989 – The Round Table Talks start in Poland, thus marking the beginning of the overthrow of communism in Eastern Europe.
1996 – Willamette Valley Flood: Floods in the Willamette Valley of Oregon, United States, causes over US$500 million in property damage throughout the Pacific Northwest.
  1996   – Birgenair Flight 301 crashed off the coast of the Dominican Republic, killing all 189 people on board. This is the deadliest aviation accident involving a Boeing 757.
1998 – Washington National Airport is renamed Ronald Reagan National Airport.
2000 – Second Chechen War: Russia captures Grozny, Chechnya, forcing the separatist Chechen Republic of Ichkeria government into exile.
2006 – Stephen Harper becomes Prime Minister of Canada.
2012 – A magnitude 6.7 earthquake hits the central Philippine island of Negros, leaving 112 people dead.
2016 – An earthquake of magnitude 6.6 strikes southern Taiwan, killing 117 people.
2018 – SpaceX's Falcon Heavy, a super heavy launch vehicle, makes its maiden flight.
2021 – U.S. Secretary of State Antony Blinken suspends agreements with Guatemala, El Salvador and Honduras to send asylum seekers back to their home countries.
2023 – An earthquake with a magnitude of 7.8 struck near the border between Turkey and Syria with a maximum Mercalli intensity of XI (Extreme). The earthquake resulted in numerous aftershocks and a death toll of more than 50,000 people.

Births

Pre-1600
 885 – Emperor Daigo of Japan (d. 930)
1402 – Louis I, Landgrave of Hesse, Landgrave of Hesse (d. 1458)
1452 – Joanna, Princess of Portugal (d. 1490)
1453 – Girolamo Benivieni, Florentine poet (d. 1542)
1465 – Scipione del Ferro, Italian mathematician and theorist (d. 1526)
1536 – Sassa Narimasa, Japanese samurai (d. 1588)
1577 – Beatrice Cenci, Italian murderer (d. 1599)
1582 – Mario Bettinus, Italian mathematician, astronomer, and philosopher (d. 1657)

1601–1900
1605 – Bernard of Corleone, Italian saint (d. 1667)
1608 – António Vieira, Portuguese priest and philosopher (d. 1697)
1611 – Chongzhen Emperor of China (d. 1644)
1612 – Antoine Arnauld, French mathematician, theologian, and philosopher (d. 1694)
1643 – Johann Kasimir Kolbe von Wartenberg, Prussian politician, 1st Minister President of Prussia (d. 1712)
1649 – Augusta Marie of Holstein-Gottorp, German noblewoman (d. 1728)
1664 – Mustafa II, Ottoman sultan (d. 1703)
1665 – Anne, Queen of Great Britain, Queen of England, Scotland and Ireland (d. 1714)
1695 – Nicolaus II Bernoulli, Swiss-Russian mathematician and theorist (d. 1726)
1719 – Alberto Pullicino, Maltese painter (d. 1759)
1726 – Patrick Russell, Scottish surgeon and zoologist (d. 1805)
1732 – Charles Lee, English-American general (d. 1782)
1736 – Franz Xaver Messerschmidt, German-Austrian sculptor (d. 1783)
1744 – Pierre-Joseph Desault, French anatomist and surgeon (d. 1795)
1748 – Adam Weishaupt, German philosopher and academic, founded the Illuminati (d. 1830)
1753 – Évariste de Parny, French poet and author (d. 1814)
1756 – Aaron Burr, American colonel and politician, 3rd Vice President of the United States (d. 1836)
1758 – Julian Ursyn Niemcewicz, Belarusian-Polish poet, playwright, and politician (d. 1841)
1769 – Ludwig von Wallmoden-Gimborn, Austrian general (d. 1862)
1772 – George Murray, Scottish general and politician, Secretary of State for War and the Colonies (d. 1830)
1778 – Ugo Foscolo, Italian author and poet (d. 1827)
1781 – John Keane, 1st Baron Keane, Irish general and politician, Governor of Saint Lucia (d. 1844)
1796 – John Stevens Henslow, English botanist and geologist (d. 1861)
1797 – Joseph von Radowitz, Prussian general and politician, Foreign Minister of Prussia (d. 1853)
1799 – Imre Frivaldszky, Hungarian botanist and entomologist (d. 1870)
1800 – Achille Devéria, French painter and lithographer (d. 1857)
1802 – Charles Wheatstone, English-French physicist and cryptographer (d. 1875)
1811 – Henry Liddell, English priest, author, and academic (d. 1898)
1814 – Auguste Chapdelaine, French missionary and saint (d. 1856)
1818 – William M. Evarts, American lawyer and politician, 27th United States Secretary of State (d. 1901)
1820 – Thomas C. Durant, American railroad tycoon (d. 1885)
1829 – Joseph Auguste Émile Vaudremer, French architect, designed the La Santé Prison and Saint-Pierre-de-Montrouge (d. 1914)
1832 – John Brown Gordon, American general and politician, 53rd Governor of Georgia (d. 1904)
1833 – José María de Pereda, Spanish author and academic (d. 1906)
  1833   – J. E. B. Stuart, American general (d. 1864)
1834 – Edwin Klebs, German-Swiss pathologist and academic (d. 1913)
  1834   – Ema Pukšec, Croatian-German soprano (d. 1889)
  1834   – Wilhelm von Scherff, German general and author (d. 1911)
1838 – Henry Irving, English actor and manager (d. 1905)
  1838   – Israel Meir Kagan, Lithuanian-Polish rabbi and author (d. 1933)
1839 – Eduard Hitzig, German neurologist and psychiatrist (d. 1907)
1842 – Alexandre Ribot, French academic and politician, Prime Minister of France (d. 1923)
1843 – Inoue Kowashi, Japanese scholar and politician (d. 1895)
  1843   – Frederic William Henry Myers, English poet and philologist, co-founded the Society for Psychical Research (d. 1901)
1845 – Isidor Straus, German-American businessman and politician (d. 1912)
1847 – Henry Janeway Hardenbergh, American architect, designed the Plaza Hotel (d. 1918)
1852 – C. Lloyd Morgan, English zoologist and psychologist (d. 1936)
  1852   – Vasily Safonov, Russian pianist, composer, and conductor (d. 1918)
1861 – Nikolay Zelinsky, Russian chemist and academic (d. 1953)
1864 – John Henry Mackay, Scottish-German philosopher and author (d. 1933)
1866 – Karl Sapper, German linguist and explorer (d. 1945)
1872 – Robert Maillart, Swiss engineer, designed the Salginatobel Bridge and Schwandbach Bridge (d. 1940)
1874 – Bhaktisiddhanta Sarasvati Thakura, Indian religious leader, founded the Gaudiya Math (d. 1937)
1875 – Leonid Gobyato, Russian general (d. 1915)
1876 – Henry Blogg, English fisherman and sailor (d. 1954)
1879 – Othon Friesz, French painter (d. 1949)
  1879   – Magnús Guðmundsson, Icelandic lawyer and politician, 3rd Prime Minister of Iceland (d. 1937)
  1879   – Edwin Samuel Montagu, English politician, Chancellor of the Duchy of Lancaster (d. 1924)
  1879   – Carl Ramsauer, German physicist and author (d. 1955)
1880 – Nishinoumi Kajirō II, Japanese sumo wrestler, the 25th Yokozuna (d. 1931)
1884 – Marcel Cohen, French linguist and scholar (d. 1974)
1887 – Josef Frings, German cardinal (d. 1978)
1890 – Khan Abdul Ghaffar Khan, Pakistani activist and politician (d. 1988)
  1890   – James McGirr, Australian politician, 28th Premier of New South Wales (d. 1957)
1892 – Maximilian Fretter-Pico, German general (d. 1984)
  1892   – William P. Murphy, American physician and academic, Nobel Prize laureate (d. 1987)
1893 – Muhammad Zafarullah Khan, Pakistani politician and diplomat, 1st Minister of Foreign Affairs for Pakistan (d. 1985)
1894 – Eric Partridge, New Zealand-English lexicographer and academic (d. 1979)
  1894   – Kirpal Singh, Indian spiritual master (d. 1974)
1895 – Robert La Follette Jr., American politician (d. 1953)
  1895   – María Teresa Vera, Cuban singer, guitarist and composer (d. 1965) 
  1895   – Babe Ruth, American baseball player and coach (d. 1948)
1898 – Harry Haywood, American soldier and politician (d. 1985)
1899 – Ramon Novarro, Mexican-American actor, singer, and director (d. 1968)

1901–present
1901 – Ben Lyon, American actor (d. 1979)
1902 – George Brunies, American trombonist (d. 1974)
1903 – Claudio Arrau, Chilean pianist and composer (d. 1991)
1905 – Władysław Gomułka, Polish politician (d. 1982)
  1905   – Jan Werich, Czech actor and playwright (d. 1980)
1906 – Joseph Schull, Canadian playwright and historian (d. 1980)
1908 – Amintore Fanfani, Italian journalist and politician, 32nd Prime Minister of Italy (d. 1999)
  1908   – Edward Lansdale, American general and CIA agent (d. 1987)
  1908   – Geo Bogza, Romanian poet and journalist (d. 1993)
  1908   – Michael Maltese, American actor, screenwriter, and composer (d. 1981)
1910 – Roman Czerniawski, Polish air force officer and spy (d. 1985)
  1910   – Irmgard Keun, German author (d. 1982)
  1910   – Carlos Marcello, Tunisian-American gangster (d. 1993)
1911 – Ronald Reagan, American actor and politician, 40th President of the United States (d. 2004)
1912 – Eva Braun, German wife of Adolf Hitler (d. 1945)
  1912   – Christopher Hill, English historian and author (d. 2003)
1913 – Mary Leakey, English-Kenyan archaeologist and anthropologist (d. 1996)
1914 – Thurl Ravenscroft, American voice actor and singer (d. 2005)
1915 – Kavi Pradeep, Indian poet and songwriter (d. 1998)
1916 – John Crank, English mathematician and physicist (d. 2006)
1917 – Louis-Philippe de Grandpré, Canadian lawyer and jurist (d. 2008)
  1917   – Zsa Zsa Gabor, Hungarian-American actress and socialite (d. 2016)
1918 – Lothar-Günther Buchheim, German author and painter (d. 2007)
1919 – Takashi Yanase, Japanese poet and illustrator, created Anpanman (d. 2013)
1921 – Carl Neumann Degler, American historian and author (d. 2014)
  1921   – Bob Scott, New Zealand rugby player (d. 2012)
1922 – Patrick Macnee, English-American actor and costume designer (d. 2015)
  1922   – Denis Norden, English actor, screenwriter, and television host (d. 2018)
  1922   – Haskell Wexler, American director, producer, and cinematographer (d. 2015)
1923 – Gyula Lóránt, Hungarian footballer and manager (d. 1981)
1924 – Billy Wright, English footballer and manager (d. 1994)
  1924   – Jin Yong, Hong Kong author and publisher, founded Ming Pao (d. 2018)
1925 – Walker Edmiston, American actor and puppeteer (d. 2007)
1927 – Gerard K. O'Neill, American physicist and astronomer (d. 1992)
1928 – Allan H. Meltzer, American economist and academic (d. 2017)
1929 – Colin Murdoch, New Zealand pharmacist and veterinarian, invented the tranquilliser gun (d. 2008)
  1929   – Oscar Sambrano Urdaneta, Venezuelan author and critic (d. 2011)
  1929   – Valentin Yanin, Russian historian and author (d. 2020)
1930 – Jun Kondo, Japanese physicist and academic (d. 2022)
1931 – Rip Torn, American actor (d. 2019)
  1931   – Fred Trueman, English cricketer (d. 2006)
  1931   – Mamie Van Doren, American actress and model
  1931   – Ricardo Vidal, Filipino cardinal (d. 2017)
1932 – Camilo Cienfuegos, Cuban soldier and anarchist (d. 1959)
  1932   – François Truffaut, French actor, director, producer, and screenwriter (d. 1984)
1933 – Leslie Crowther, English comedian, actor, and game show host (d. 1996)
1936 – Kent Douglas, Canadian ice hockey player and coach (d. 2009)
1938 – Fred Mifflin, Canadian admiral and politician, 19th Minister of Veterans Affairs (d. 2013)
1939 – Jean Beaudin, Canadian director and screenwriter (d. 2019)
  1939   – Mike Farrell, American actor, director, producer, activist and public speaker
  1939   – Jair Rodrigues, Brazilian singer (d. 2014)
1940 – Tom Brokaw, American journalist and author
  1940   – Petr Hájek, Czech mathematician and academic (d. 2016)
  1940   – Jimmy Tarbuck, English comedian and actor
1941 – Stephen Albert, American pianist and composer (d. 1992)
  1941   – Dave Berry, English pop singer
  1941   – Gigi Perreau, American actress and director
1942 – Sarah Brady, American activist and author (d. 2015)
  1942   – Charlie Coles, American basketball player and coach (d. 2013)
  1942   – Ahmad-Jabir Ahmadov, Azerbaijani philosopher and academic (d. 2021)
  1942   – James Loewen, American sociologist and historian
  1942   – Tommy Roberts, English fashion designer (d. 2012)
1943 – Fabian Forte, American pop singer and actor
  1943   – Gayle Hunnicutt, American actress
1944 – Christine Boutin, French politician, French Minister of Housing and Urban Development
  1944   – Willie Tee, American singer-songwriter, keyboard player, and producer (d. 2007)
  1944   – Michael Tucker, American actor and producer
1945 – Bob Marley, Jamaican singer-songwriter and guitarist (d. 1981)
1946 – Richie Hayward, American drummer and songwriter  (d. 2010)
  1946   – Kate McGarrigle, Canadian musician and singer-songwriter (d. 2010)
  1946   – Jim Turner, American captain and politician
1947 – Bill Staines, American singer-songwriter and guitarist
  1947   – Charlie Hickcox, American swimmer (d .2010)
1949 – Mike Batt, English singer-songwriter and producer 
  1949   – Manuel Orantes, Spanish tennis player
  1949   – Jim Sheridan, Irish director, producer, and screenwriter
1950 – Natalie Cole, American singer-songwriter and actress (d. 2015)
  1950   – Timothy M. Dolan, American cardinal
  1950   – Punky Meadows, American rock guitarist and songwriter
1952 – Ric Charlesworth, Australian cricketer, coach, and politician
  1952   – Viktor Giacobbo, Swiss actor, producer, and screenwriter
  1952   – Ricardo La Volpe, Argentinian footballer, manager, and coach 
1955 – Avram Grant, Israeli football manager
  1955   – Michael Pollan, American journalist, author, and academic
  1955   – Bruno Stolorz, French rugby player and coach
1956 – Jerry Marotta, American drummer
1957 – Andres Lipstok, Estonian economist and politician, Estonian Minister of Economic Affairs
  1957   – Kathy Najimy, American actress and comedian
  1957   – Simon Phillips, English drummer and producer 
  1957   – Robert Townsend, American actor and director
1958 – Cecily Adams, American actress and casting director (d. 2004)
1960 – Jeremy Bowen, Welsh journalist
  1960   – Megan Gallagher, American actress
1961 – Michael Bolt, Australian rugby league player 
  1961   – Cam Cameron, American football player and coach
  1961   – Bill Lester, American race car driver
  1961   – Yury Onufriyenko, Ukrainian-Russian colonel, pilot, and astronaut
1962 – Stavros Lambrinidis, Greek lawyer and politician, Minister of Foreign Affairs for Greece
  1962   – Axl Rose, American singer-songwriter and producer 
1963 – David Capel, English cricketer (d. 2020)
  1963   – Scott Gordon, American ice hockey player and coach
  1963   – Quentin Letts, English journalist and critic
1964 – Laurent Cabannes, French rugby player
  1964   – Gordon Downie, Canadian singer-songwriter, guitarist, and actor (d. 2017)
  1964   – Colin Miller, Australian cricketer and sportscaster
  1964   – Andrey Zvyagintsev, Russian actor and director
1965 – Jan Svěrák, Czech actor, director, and screenwriter
1966 – Rick Astley, English singer-songwriter
1967 – Anita Cochran, American singer-songwriter, guitarist, and producer
  1967   – Izumi Sakai, Japanese singer-songwriter (d. 2007)
  1967   – Michelle Thrush, Canadian actress and activist
1968 – Adolfo Valencia, Colombian footballer
  1968   – Akira Yamaoka, Japanese composer and producer
1969 – David Hayter, American actor and screenwriter
  1969   – Masaharu Fukuyama, Japanese singer-songwriter, producer, and actor
  1969   – Tim Sherwood, English international footballer and manager
  1969   – Bob Wickman, American baseball player
1970 – Per Frandsen, Danish footballer and manager
  1970   – Tim Herron, American golfer
1971 – Brad Hogg, Australian cricketer
  1971   – Carlos Rogers, American basketball player
1972 – Stefano Bettarini, Italian footballer
  1972   – David Binn, American football player
1974 – Aljo Bendijo, Filipino journalist
1975 – Chad Allen, American baseball player and coach
  1975   – Orkut Büyükkökten, Turkish computer scientist and engineer, created Orkut
  1975   – Tomoko Kawase, Japanese singer-songwriter and producer 
1976 – Tanja Frieden, Swiss snowboarder and educator
  1976   – Kim Zmeskal, American gymnast and coach
1977 – Josh Stewart, American actor
1978 – Yael Naim, French-Israeli singer-songwriter
1979 – Dan Bălan, Moldovan singer-songwriter and producer 
1980 – Kerry Jeremy, Antiguan cricketer
  1980   – Kim Poirier, Canadian actress, singer, and producer
  1980   – Luke Ravenstahl, American politician, 58th Mayor of Pittsburgh
1981 – Ricky Barnes, American golfer
  1981   – Calum Best, American-English model and actor
  1981   – Shim Eun-jin, South Korean singer and actress 
  1981   – Alison Haislip, American actress and producer
  1981   – Jens Lekman, Swedish singer-songwriter and guitarist
  1981   – Ty Warren, American football player
1982 – Tank, Taiwanese singer-songwriter
  1982   – Alice Eve, English actress 
  1982   – Elise Ray, American gymnast
1983 – Brodie Croyle, American football player
  1983   – Dimas Delgado, Spanish footballer
  1983   – S. Sreesanth, Indian cricketer
  1983   – Jamie Whincup, Australian race car driver
1984 – Darren Bent, English international footballer
  1984   – Piret Järvis, Estonian singer-songwriter and guitarist 
  1984   – Antoine Wright, American basketball player
1985 – Ben Creagh, Australian rugby league player
  1985   – Fallulah, Danish singer-songwriter
  1985   – Kris Humphries, American basketball player
1986 – Dane DeHaan, American actor 
  1986   – Tony Johnson, American mixed martial artist
  1986   – Yunho, South Korean singer and actor
1988 – Bailey Hanks, American actress, singer, and dancer
1989 – Craig Cathcart, Northern Irish footballer
  1989   – Jonny Flynn, American basketball player
1990 – Adam Henrique, Canadian ice hockey player
  1990   – Jermaine Kearse, American football player
  1990   – Aida Rybalko, Lithuanian figure skater
1991 – Tobias Eisenbauer, Austrian ice dancer
  1991   – Aleksandar Katai, Serbian footballer
  1991   – Ida Njåtun, Norwegian speed skater
  1991   – Eva Wacanno, Dutch tennis player
  1991   – Fei Yu, Chinese footballer
1992 – Víctor Mañón, Mexican footballer
1993 – Teresa Scanlan, American beauty pageant titleholder, Miss America 2011
  1993   – Tinashe, American singer-songwriter, dancer, and actress 
1994 – Charlie Heaton, British actor and musician 
1995 – Nyck de Vries, Dutch racing driver
  1995   – Leon Goretzka, German footballer
  1995   – Sam McQueen, English footballer

Deaths

Pre-1600
 743 – Hisham ibn Abd al-Malik, Umayyad caliph (b. 691)
 797 – Donnchad Midi, Irish king (b. 733)
 891 – Photios I of Constantinople (b. 810)
1140 – Thurstan, Archbishop of York
1215 – Hōjō Tokimasa, Japanese shikken of the Kamakura bakufu (b. 1138)
1378 – Joanna of Bourbon (b. 1338)
1411 – Esau de' Buondelmonti, ruler of Epirus 
1497 – Johannes Ockeghem, Flemish composer and educator (b. 1410)
1515 – Aldus Manutius, Italian publisher, founded the Aldine Press (b. 1449)
1519 – Lorenz von Bibra, Prince-Bishop of the Bishopric of Würzburg (b. 1459)
1539 – John III, Duke of Cleves (b. 1491)
1585 – Edmund Plowden, English lawyer and scholar (b. 1518)
1593 – Jacques Amyot, French author and translator (b. 1513)
  1593   – Emperor Ōgimachi of Japan (b. 1517)
1597 – Franciscus Patricius, Italian philosopher and scientist (b. 1529)

1601–1900
1612 – Christopher Clavius, German mathematician and astronomer (b. 1538)
1617 – Prospero Alpini, Italian physician and botanist (b. 1553)
1685 – Charles II of England (b. 1630)
1695 – Ahmed II, Ottoman sultan (b. 1642)
1740 – Pope Clement XII (b. 1652)
1775 – William Dowdeswell, English politician, Chancellor of the Exchequer (b. 1721)
1783 – Capability Brown, English gardener and architect (b. 1716)
1793 – Carlo Goldoni, Italian-French playwright (b. 1707)
1804 – Joseph Priestley, English chemist and theologian (b. 1733)
1833 – Pierre André Latreille, French zoologist and entomologist (b. 1762)
1834 – Richard Lemon Lander, English explorer (b. 1804)
1865 – Isabella Beeton, English author of Mrs Beeton's Book of Household Management (b. 1836)
1899 – Leo von Caprivi, German general and politician, Chancellor of Germany (b. 1831)

1901–present
1902 – John Colton, English-Australian politician, 13th Premier of South Australia (b. 1823)
1908 – Harriet Samuel, English businesswoman and founder the jewellery retailer H. Samuel (b. 1836)
1916 – Rubén Darío, Nicaraguan poet, journalist, and diplomat (b. 1867)
1918 – Gustav Klimt, Austrian painter and illustrator (b. 1862)
1929 – Maria Christina of Austria (b. 1858)
1931 – Motilal Nehru, Indian lawyer and politician, President of the Indian National Congress (b. 1861)
1932 – John Earle, Australian politician, 22nd Premier of Tasmania (b. 1865)
1938 – Marianne von Werefkin, Russian-Swiss painter (b. 1860)
1942 – Jaan Soots, Estonian general and politician, 7th Estonian Minister of War (b. 1880)
1951 – Gabby Street, American baseball player, coach, and manager (b. 1882)
1952 – George VI of the United Kingdom (b. 1895)
1958 – victims of the Munich air disaster
                Geoff Bent, English footballer (b. 1932)
                Roger Byrne, English footballer (b. 1929)
                Eddie Colman, English footballer (b. 1936)
                Walter Crickmer, English footballer and manager (b. 1900)
                Mark Jones, English footballer (b. 1933)
                David Pegg, English footballer (b. 1935)
                Frank Swift, English footballer and journalist (b. 1913)
                Tommy Taylor, English footballer (b. 1932)
1963 – Piero Manzoni, Italian painter and sculptor (b. 1933)
1964 – Emilio Aguinaldo, Filipino general and politician, 1st President of the Philippines (b. 1869)
1967 – Martine Carol, French actress (b. 1920)
1971 – Lew "Sneaky Pete" Robinson, drag racer (b. 1933)
1972 – Julian Steward, American anthropologist (b. 1902)
1976 – Ritwik Ghatak, Bangladeshi-Indian director and screenwriter (b. 1925)
  1976   – Vince Guaraldi, American singer-songwriter and pianist (b. 1928)
1981 – Hugo Montenegro, American composer and conductor (b. 1925)
1982 – Ben Nicholson, British painter (b. 1894)
1985 – James Hadley Chase, English-Swiss soldier and author (b. 1906)
1986 – Frederick Coutts, Scottish 8th General of The Salvation Army (b. 1899)
  1986   – Dandy Nichols, English actress (b. 1907)
  1986   – Minoru Yamasaki, American architect, designed the World Trade Center (b. 1912)
1987 – Julien Chouinard, Canadian lawyer and jurist (b. 1929)
1989 – Barbara W. Tuchman, American historian and author (b. 1912)
1990 – Jimmy Van Heusen, American pianist and composer (b. 1913)
1991 – Salvador Luria, Italian biologist and physician, Nobel Prize laureate (b. 1912)
  1991   – Danny Thomas, American actor, producer, and humanitarian (b. 1914)
1993 – Arthur Ashe, American tennis player and sportscaster (b. 1943)
1994 – Joseph Cotten, American actor (b. 1905)
  1994   – Jack Kirby, American author and illustrator (b. 1917)
1995 – James Merrill, American poet and playwright  (b. 1926)
1998 – Falco, Austrian pop-rock musician  (b. 1957)
1999 – Don Dunstan, Australian lawyer and politician, 35th Premier of South Australia (b. 1926)
  1999   – Jimmy Roberts, American tenor (b. 1924)
2000 – Phil Walters, American race car driver (b. 1916)
  2000   – Hani al-Rahib, Syrian novelist and literary academic (b. 1939)
2001 – Filemon Lagman, Filipino theoretician and activist (b. 1953)
  2001   – Trần Văn Lắm, South Vietnamese diplomat and politician (b. 1913)
2002 – Max Perutz, Austrian-English biologist and academic, Nobel Prize laureate (b. 1914)
2004 – Gerald Bouey, Canadian lieutenant and economist (b. 1920)
2005 – Karl Haas, German-American pianist, conductor, and radio host (b. 1913)
2007 – Lew Burdette, American baseball player and coach (b. 1926)
  2007   – Frankie Laine, American singer-songwriter and actor (b. 1913)
  2007   – Willye White, American runner and long jumper (b. 1939)
2008 – Tony Rolt, English race car driver and engineer (b. 1918)
2009 – Philip Carey, American actor (b. 1925)
  2009   – Shirley Jean Rickert, American actress (b. 1926)
  2009   – James Whitmore, American actor (b. 1921)
2011 – Gary Moore, Irish singer-songwriter, guitarist, and producer (b. 1952)
2012 – David Rosenhan, American psychologist and academic (b. 1929)
  2012   – Antoni Tàpies, Spanish painter and sculptor (b. 1923)
  2012   – Janice E. Voss, American engineer and astronaut (b. 1956)
2013 – Chokri Belaid, Tunisian lawyer and politician (b. 1964)
  2013   – Menachem Elon, German-Israeli academic and jurist (b. 1923)
2014 – Vasiľ Biľak, Slovak politician (b. 1917)
  2014   – Ralph Kiner, American baseball player and sportscaster (b. 1922)
  2014   – Maxine Kumin, American author and poet (b. 1925)
  2014   – Vaçe Zela, Albanian-Swiss singer and guitarist (b. 1939)
2015 – André Brink, South African author and playwright (b. 1935)
  2015   – Alan Nunnelee, American lawyer and politician (b. 1958)
  2015   – Pedro León Zapata, Venezuelan cartoonist (b. 1929)
2016 – Dan Gerson, American screenwriter (b. 1966)
  2016   – Dan Hicks, American singer-songwriter and guitarist (b. 1941)
2017 – Irwin Corey, American comedian and actor (b. 1914)
  2017   – Inge Keller, German actress (b. 1923)
  2017   – Alec McCowen, English actor (b. 1925)
  2017   – Joost van der Westhuizen, South African rugby union footballer (b. 1971)
2018 – Donald Lynden-Bell, English astrophysicist (b. 1935)
2019 – Manfred Eigen, German Nobel Prize winning biophysical chemist (b. 1927)
  2019   – Rosamunde Pilcher, British author (born 1924)
2020 – Jhon Jairo Velásquez, Colombian hitman and drug dealer (b. 1962)
2021 – George Shultz, American politician, Secretary of State, Secretary of the Treasury, Secretary of Labor (b. 1920)
2022 – Lata Mangeshkar, Indian singer and music composer (b. 1929)

Holidays and observances
 Christian feast day:
 Amand
 Dorothea of Caesarea
 Hildegund, O.Praem.
 Jacut
 Mateo Correa Magallanes (one of Saints of the Cristero War)
 Mél of Ardagh 
 Paul Miki and Twenty-six Martyrs of Japan
 Relindis (Renule) of Maaseik
 Vedastus
 February 6 (Eastern Orthodox liturgics)
 International Day of Zero Tolerance to Female Genital Mutilation (United Nations)
 Ronald Reagan Day (California, United States)
 Sami National Day (Russia, Finland, Norway and Sweden)
 Waitangi Day, celebrates the founding of New Zealand in 1840.

References

External links

 BBC: On This Day
 
 Historical Events on February 6

Days of the year
February